Charles Edwards  (1854 – 1943) was a Welsh international footballer. He was part of the Wales national football team, playing 1 match on 23 March 1878 against Scotland. At club level, he played for Wrexham.

Honours

Wrexham

Welsh Cup
Winners: 1877–78
Runners-up:1878-79

See also
 List of Wales international footballers (alphabetical)

References

External links
 
 

1854 births
Welsh footballers
Wales international footballers
Wrexham A.F.C. players
Place of birth missing
Date of death missing
1943 deaths
Association football forwards